Kale is an attractive rural district of Denizli Province of Turkey near the town of Tavas. Kale is a 45-minute drive from Denizli on the road from the city of Denizli to the Aegean city of Muğla. The mayor is İsmail Yarımca (MHP).  

The climate is hot in summer, cold in winter and being high up the summer evenings are cool as well.

History
Kale means castle in Turkish and in antiquity the castle of Tabae (or Tabai, Taba Tabenon) stood high on a rock commanding a mountain pass (although there are many places called Tabae and it may be that this was simply the word for rock.) The castle was apparently built by the followers of Alexander the Great, and coinage was minted here in the Hellenistic and Roman periods.

The area remained under Byzantine rule until the beginning of the 12th century when it fell to the Seljuk Turks, who ruled until the late 13th century, when Seljuk power was weakened in the wake of Mongol invasion. The area was brought into the Ottoman Empire in 1424 by Murat II.

Kale today

Kale is famous for growing tobacco and peppers and they have an annual pepper harvest festival.

References

Populated places in Denizli Province
Districts of Denizli Province